Marcello Romeo Lippi  (born 12 April 1948) is an Italian former professional football player and manager, who led the Italy national team to victory in the 2006 FIFA World Cup.

He was appointed as Italy head coach in the summer of 2004 and 2008, and he was succeeded by Cesare Prandelli after a disappointing performance in the 2010 FIFA World Cup.

Throughout his career as a manager, he won one World Cup title, five Serie A titles, three Chinese Super League titles, one Coppa Italia, one Chinese FA Cup, four Italian Supercups, one UEFA Champions League, one AFC Champions League, one UEFA Super Cup and one Intercontinental Cup. Lippi is the first and to date the only coach to win both the UEFA Champions League and the AFC Champions League. He is also the first coach to have won the most prestigious international competitions both for clubs in different continents, and for national teams (the UEFA Champions League and the Intercontinental Cup in 1996 with Juventus; the AFC Champions League in 2013 with Guangzhou Evergrande; and the FIFA World Cup in 2006 with Italy).

Lippi is regarded as one of the greatest and most successful managers in football history, and in 2007, The Times included him on its list of the top 50 managers of all time. He was named the world's best football manager by the International Federation of Football History & Statistics (IFFHS) both in 1996 and 1998, and world's best National coach in 2006.

Club career

Born in Viareggio, in northern Tuscany, Lippi began his professional career as a defender in 1969, in the role of sweeper. He spent most of his playing years with Sampdoria, where he played consecutively from 1969 to 1978, except for a year on loan at Savona. In 1979, he joined Pistoiese, being part of the Arancionis promotion to Serie A. He finished his playing career with Lucchese.

Coaching career

Early career
Lippi retired from active football in 1982, at the age of 34, to pursue a coaching career. Despite never having played for Italy at senior level, Lippi gained experience playing in his country's top flight as a central defender for Sampdoria. His rise to the top of the managerial tree also began at the Genoese club, where he started as a youth-team coach. After various stints in Italy's lower divisions, he became a head coach in Serie A in 1989 with Cesena. Lippi then moved on to Lucchese and Atalanta. The turning point for Lippi came in the 1993–94 season when he led Napoli to a place in the UEFA Cup. The achievement was all the more remarkable given the financial turmoil of a club still basking in the past triumphs inspired by Diego Maradona.

Juventus
With his success at Napoli, Lippi became a managerial target for the top Serie A clubs, with Juventus ultimately winning the race to secure his services. He won the Serie A title and the Coppa Italia in his first season at the club, also reaching the 1995 UEFA Cup Final, with a team that included players who would play an important role in the club's future successes, including Gianluca Vialli, Fabrizio Ravanelli, Roberto Baggio, Alessandro Del Piero, Angelo Peruzzi, Angelo Di Livio, Moreno Torricelli, Didier Deschamps, Paulo Sousa, Antonio Conte, Alessio Tacchinardi and Giancarlo Marocchi, as well as Ciro Ferrara, a player Lippi had previously coached at Napoli and who later acted as his assistant with the Azzurri. The following season, Lippi guided Juventus to 1995 Supercoppa Italiana and the 1995–96 UEFA Champions League titles. With the arrival of several new key players which included Zinedine Zidane, Edgar Davids, Filippo Inzaghi, Mark Iuliano, Paolo Montero and Igor Tudor, these victories were followed by consecutive league titles, the 1996 UEFA Super Cup, the 1996 Intercontinental Cup and the 1997 Supercoppa Italiana, as well as two more consecutive Champions League finals and another semi-final.

Inter
After five highly successful seasons at Juventus, Lippi moved to Internazionale in 1999, leading the club to a fourth-place finish in the league and the 2000 Coppa Italia Final, though he was sacked after suffering a disappointing defeat in the first match-day of the 2000–01 Serie A season; having previously also received significant criticism due to his poor results in his previous season with the Nerazzurri, and after Inter were eliminated from the 2000–01 UEFA Champions League in the third qualifying round by Swedish underdogs Helsingborgs IF without managing to score a goal over the two legs.

Second spell with Juventus
Following the sacking of Carlo Ancelotti, Lippi was subsequently re-appointed as Juventus' head coach for the 2001–02 season. Following the departure of Inzaghi to Milan and Zidane to Real Madrid for a world record fee, the club acquired Pavel Nedvěd, Gianluigi Buffon and Lilian Thuram to reinforce its line-up, and managed to win two further scudetti under Lippi, as he also led the bianconeri to consecutive Supercoppa Italiana titles and two Coppa Italia finals, as well as the 2003 UEFA Champions League Final held at Old Trafford; Juventus lost out to Milan in a penalty shootout, however, after both the teams failed to score during regulation and extra time.

Other
In March 2007, Lippi managed a Europe XI team who played Manchester United in a UEFA Celebration Match, commemorating the 50th anniversary of the signing of the Treaty of Rome and the 50th year of Manchester United's participation in European competitions. His team lost 4–3 at Old Trafford.

Italy national team

Lippi was appointed head of the Italy national team in July 2004, following a disappointing UEFA Euro 2004 campaign under Giovanni Trapattoni. The Azzurri secured their passage to the FIFA World Cup finals with relative ease and subsequent victories, such as the 3–1 victory over the Netherlands and a 4–1 win over Germany in friendly matches, which raised expectations considerably. During the late weeks of the 2005–06 season Lippi was under scrutiny surrounding the 2006 Serie A scandal (Calciopoli); blamed because of his long-standing ties and previous history with Juventus, and pressured to step down as Italy coach.

Throughout the 2006 World Cup, Lippi was praised for rotating several players (fielding 21) and adopting several tactical systems that allowed his two star playmakers, Francesco Totti and Andrea Pirlo, to play alongside each other and contribute to Italy's offensive play, assisting many of the team's goals, eventually settling on a 4–2–3–1 formation. In Lippi's formation, Totti occupied the advanced creative role behind the main forward, in particular target-man Luca Toni, while Pirlo was deployed in the deep-lying playmaking role; the two players were supported defensively by hard-working box-to-box midfielders, such as Daniele De Rossi, Gennaro Gattuso, Simone Perrotta and Simone Barone, as well as winger Mauro Camoranesi, and attacking full-backs Gianluca Zambrotta and Fabio Grosso, who were expected to push up the flanks. The Pirlo-Gattuso partnership in Italy's midfield, in particular, proved to be extremely effective, as Lippi led Italy all the way to the final of the tournament, where they beat France 5–3 in a penalty shoot-out after a 1–1 draw. While the team was praised for adopting a more offensive approach than Lippi's predecessors, which saw a World Cup record of ten of the team's 23 players score, with the squad netting 12 goals in total, the team also stood out for its defensive stability. Led by captain and eventual 2006 Ballon d'Or winner Fabio Cannavaro, Italy's back-line and goalkeeper – Gianluigi Buffon – only conceded two goals throughout the tournament, neither of which occurred in open play.

After winning the World Cup, Lippi stated that this was his "most satisfying moment as a coach", even after winning the Intercontinental Cup and the UEFA Champions League with Juventus. Three days after the final, Lippi did not renew his expiring contract with the Italian Football Federation (FIGC), and left his office as coach of Italy. He was succeeded by Roberto Donadoni. Following his stint as Italy's manager, Lippi served as a commentator for 2007–08 UEFA Champions League matches for Sky Sport.

Under the management of Donadoni, Italy was eliminated at UEFA Euro 2008 at the quarter-final stage by Spain on penalties, prompting Donadoni's dismissal. On 26 June 2008, Lippi was re-appointed as coach of Italy. Italy took part in the 2009 FIFA Confederations Cup under Lippi, where they suffered a first-round elimination following a 3–0 loss to Brazil in their final group match. Later that same year, Italy qualified for the 2010 World Cup with two games to spare following a 2–2 away draw against Ireland on 10 October.

For the 2010 World Cup, Lippi selected mostly veterans of the victorious 2006 squad, omitting younger players such as Mario Balotelli and Giuseppe Rossi, in addition to notable players such as Antonio Cassano. Italy's performance at the 2010 World Cup was extremely poor, drawing 1–1 with both Paraguay and New Zealand before losing 3–2 to Slovakia and finishing bottom of the group. Lippi resigned after the Slovakia defeat, and was succeeded by Cesare Prandelli.

Guangzhou Evergrande

On 17 May 2012, Chinese Super League side Guangzhou Evergrande announced that they had officially signed Lippi on a two-and-a-half-year deal worth around €30 million, replacing Korean manager Lee Jang-soo. Lippi's first official game in China came three days later on 20 May, in a 1–0 home victory against Qingdao Jonoon. He achieved a double in his first season at the club by winning the league and domestic cup titles. In his second season, on 2 October 2013, Lippi led his side to the 2013 AFC Champions League Final for the first time in the club's history. Four days later, on 6 October, he led Guangzhou Evergrande to win their third consecutive Chinese Super League title by beating Shandong Luneng Taishan 4–2 away. In the final of the 2013 AFC Champions League, his side defeated FC Seoul to win the club's first Asian title. Guangzhou Evergrande, however, was later defeated in the two-legged final by Guizhou Moutai in the Chinese FA Cup, hence unable to achieve the first continental treble in Asia. Later that year, Lippi also led the club to a fourth-place finish in the 2013 FIFA Club World Cup. On 28 February 2014, Guangzhou Evergrande announced that they had officially extended Lippi's contract on a three-year deal, keeping him at the club until 2017. On 2 November 2014, Lippi publicly declared that he had retired from coaching after having guided Guangzhou Evergrande to their fourth successive league title. He continued with Guangzhou as the director of football. However, he resigned from the club on 26 February 2015.

China national team and return
On 22 October 2016, Lippi, was appointed manager of the China national team. He made his debut in a 0–0 draw against Qatar valid for the 2018 World Cup qualification. Lippi led the side during the final stage of the 2019 AFC Asian Cup, where China won 2–1 over Kyrgyzstan and 3–0 against Philippines, before losing 2–0 to group leaders South Korea on 16 January. China then beat Thailand 2–1 to earn a place in the quarter-finals, where the Chinese team was knocked out by Iran after a 3–0 defeat on 24 January; Lippi subsequently confirmed his departure as head coach.

On 24 May 2019, Marcello Lippi was re-appointed as head coach of China, replacing compatriot Fabio Cannavaro after his brief tenure. He resigned for the second time that year on 15 November, following a 2–1 defeat to Syria.

On 22 October 2020, Lippi announced his retirement from coaching.

Coaching philosophy and management style

In his book Il Gioco delle Idee: Pensieri e Passioni da Bordo Campo (A Game of Ideas: Thoughts and Passions from the Sidelines), Lippi outlined his coaching philosophy. He emphasizes the importance of team spirit and unity. He likens a psychologically well integrated team to the functioning of a psychologically healthy family. On the strategic aspect of coaching, he emphasizes the importance of mutual relations between players. Players must all follow the same plan and play for each other, "not" for themselves. Lippi argues that "a group of the best players do not necessarily make for the best team." What is more important, he argues, is that the tactical plan or formation is one that allows each player to maximize (1) his utility for his teammates and (2) the expression of his full potential. Lippi also sat the choice of tactical formation is constrained by the qualities of the team's players. Thus selecting the best possible team not only requires finding the right combination of players for the chosen formation, but also finding the right formation for the chosen players.

Regarded as one of the best and most successful managers of all time, in 2013, James Horncastle, while writing for ESPN, described Lippi has a coaching style and tactical prowess with the following words: "[His] coaching education is broader than most. He worked before, during and after the revolution brought by Arrigo Sacchi. So think of him as a bridge between the old gioco all’italiana and the new, a blend of the traditional and the modern. His teams knew how to man-mark and to play zone. They invited opponents onto them and counterattacked but could also take the game to whoever they were playing and press them in their half of the pitch. Balance was everything. Lippi's starting XIs were never fixed. They were always in discussion and would be adapted according to the opposition."

In 2017, Paolo Bandini also noted in an article for FourFourTwo that Lippi switched from his initial 4–3–3 system to a 4–4–2 formation to better accommodate the arrival of French offensive playmaker Zinedine Zidane at Juventus during the 1996–97 season; he was ultimately given licence to operate in a free role between the lines. Lippi also went on to use the 4–3–1–2 and 3–4–1–2 formations to better suit Zidane's playing style. In 1999, several journalists of La Gazzetta dello Sport praised Lippi for his charismatic leadership during his time with Juventus. Several of the club's former midfielders under Lippi went on to become managers, and have cited Lippi as an influence; these include Didier Deschamps, Paulo Sousa, Antonio Conte, and Zinedine Zidane.

Similarly, during Italy's victorious 2006 World Cup campaign, Lippi was praised for adopting several tactical systems that allowed his two star playmakers, Francesco Totti and Andrea Pirlo, to play alongside one other. He eventually settlied on a 4–2–3–1 formation, in which Totti occupied the advanced creative role behind the centre-forward, while Pirlo was deployed in the deep-lying playmaking role; the two players were supported defensively by hard-working wingers and box-to-box midfielders, as well as attacking full-backs, who provided width to the team. The team also drew praise for its defensive solidity. World Soccer magazine also noted that Lippi's tactical flexibility throughout the tournament was further demonstrated by the fact that he often changed formations throughout the course of a single match, in addition to rotating players. Indeed, the fluidity of the team's formation saw the players adopt more of a 4–4–1–1 or 4–4–2 formation when defending off the ball, which then became a more offensive 4–2–3–1 system when in possession, with the wide midfielders acting as attacking wingers.

In 2016, manager Antonio Conte praised Lippi for his coaching skills and tactical prowess, as well as his ability to communicate with and motivate his players to foster a competitive team spirit and a winning mentality; he also went on to describe his experiences as a player under Lippi with Juventus stating: "I remember when Marcello Lippi arrived from Napoli with great ambition and determination. He was very important, as he was able to transmit to us precisely what he wanted. We hit rock bottom with defeat to Foggia, so Lippi said if we have to lose, we’ll go down fighting. From then on we attacked, pressed high and took the game to the opposition. Lippi was excellent at motivating the squad and passing on his ideas. I think the most important thing for a Coach is to have a clear vision and transmit that clearly to his players. Lippi always had that, as well as a great ability to motivate us, even when we played every three days. That Juventus had four consecutive European Finals and if you think back, that was an exceptional achievement." Fabrizio Ravanelli, who, like Conte, played under Lippi at Juventus, has also praised Lippi, describing him as a manager who excelled at reading the game and motivating his players.

In 2001, former footballer Roberto Baggio, who had a difficult relationship with Lippi, and who was often critical of his former manager, also noted in his autobiography – Una porta nel cielo – that he was impressed, however, by the fact that Lippi also paid great attention to his players' diets, and to their athletic preparation, and always made use of the newest technologies and hired athletic coaches who used the most current training methods.

During his early coaching career, Lippi was also known for smoking Mercator cigars while on the bench during matches.

Managerial statistics

Honours

Manager
Juventus
Serie A: 1994–95, 1996–97, 1997–98, 2001–02, 2002–03
Coppa Italia: 1994–95
Supercoppa Italiana: 1995, 1997, 2002, 2003
UEFA Champions League: 1995–96; runner-up: 1996–97, 1997–98, 2002–03
UEFA Super Cup: 1996
Intercontinental Cup: 1996

Guangzhou Evergrande
Chinese Super League: 2012, 2013, 2014
Chinese FA Cup: 2012
Chinese FA Super Cup: 2012
AFC Champions League: 2013
Italy
FIFA World Cup: 2006
Individual
UEFA Club Coach of the Year : 1997–98
Serie A Coach of the Year: 1997, 1998, 2003
Panchina d'Oro (2): 1994–95, 1995–96, 2006 (Special Award)
IFFHS World's Best National Coach: 2006
IFFHS World's Best Club Coach: 1996, 1998
Onze d'Or Coach of the Year: 1997
World Soccer World Manager of the Year: 2006
European Coach of the Year—Sepp Herberger Award: 1996
European Coach of the Season (2): 1995–96, 1997–98
Excellence Guirlande D'Honneur by the FICTS
Italian Football Hall of Fame: 2011
Chinese Football Association Coach of the Year: 2013
World Soccer 13th Greatest Manager of All Time: 2013
ESPN 15th Greatest Manager of All Time: 2013
France Football 16th Greatest Manager of All Time: 2019
Globe Soccer Coach Career Award: 2017
Golden Foot Award Legends: 2018

Orders
  CONI: Golden Palm of Technical Merit: Palma d'oro al Merito Tecnico: 2006

  3rd Class / Commander: Commendatore Ordine al Merito della Repubblica Italiana: 2006

Records
First Coach to win both UEFA Champions League and World Cup
First Coach to win both UEFA Champions League and AFC Champions League
Lippi and Vicente del Bosque are the only two Coaches to have won both World Cup and UEFA Champions League
Coach with the most runners-up medals in UEFA Champions League: 3 (all with Juventus)
Coach with the most runners-up medals in European Competitions: 4 (all with Juventus)
Coach with second most Serie A titles: 5 (all with Juventus)
Second longest serving coach for Juventus: 405 matches
Second longest serving coach for a single club in Serie A: 405 matches with Juventus

References

Bibliography
Marcello Lippi, Il gioco delle idee: pensieri e passioni a bordo campo, Editrice San Raffaele, 2008,  ("A game of ideas: thoughts and passions from the sidelines")

External links
Coaching profile of Marcello Lippi at Goal.com

1948 births
Living people
People from Viareggio
Italian footballers
Association football defenders
U.C. Sampdoria players
Savona F.B.C. players
U.S. Pistoiese 1921 players
S.S.D. Lucchese 1905 players
Serie A players
Serie C players
Olympic footballers of Italy
Italian football managers
A.C.N. Siena 1904 managers
U.S. Pistoiese 1921 managers
Carrarese Calcio managers
A.C. Cesena managers
S.S.D. Lucchese 1905 managers
Atalanta B.C. managers
S.S.C. Napoli managers
Juventus F.C. managers
Inter Milan managers
Italy national football team managers
Guangzhou F.C. managers
China national football team managers
Serie A managers
Serie B managers
Serie C managers
UEFA Champions League winning managers
2006 FIFA World Cup managers
2009 FIFA Confederations Cup managers
2010 FIFA World Cup managers
2019 AFC Asian Cup managers
FIFA World Cup-winning managers
Italian expatriate football managers
Italian expatriate sportspeople in China
Expatriate football managers in China
Commanders of the Order of Merit of the Italian Republic
Sportspeople from the Province of Lucca
Footballers from Tuscany